Hoseynabad (also Romanized as Ḩoseynābād; also known as Ḩoseynābād-e Tappeh Sar) is a village in Yanqaq Rural District in the Central District of Galikash County, Golestan Province, Iran. At the 2006 census, its population was 685, in 158 families.

References 

Populated places in Galikash County